Anemonastrum villosissimum is a species of plant in the genus Anemonastrum, native to the Kuril Islands, Aleutian Islands, and, to a lesser extent, southern Kamchatka.

Description 
Anemonastrum villosissimum reaches a height of around 5 to 6 inches. Both its stems and its pedate leaves are villose, and it produces flowering stems which end in terminal clusters of 6-petaled, white flowers about 3/4 of an inch wide. The plant blooms mostly around June-July.

Range 
Anemonastrum villosissimum is native to the Kuril Islands, Aleutian Islands, and the southern Kamchatka Peninsula.

Habitat 
Anemonastrum villosissimum grows in open areas such as hillsides and fields in full sun, where it does not have to compete for sunlight.

Etymology 
The specific epithet "villosissimum" refers to the plant's villose leaves and stems.

References 

villosissimum